Graziana klagenfurtensis is a species of minute freshwater snails with an operculum, aquatic gastropod molluscs or micromolluscs in the family Hydrobiidae. This species is endemic to Austria.

References

Hydrobiidae
Graziana
Endemic fauna of Austria
Gastropods described in 1994
Taxonomy articles created by Polbot